Bombay State was a large Indian state created at the time of India's Independence, with other regions being added to it in the succeeding years. Bombay Presidency (roughly equating to the present-day Indian state of Maharashtra, excluding South Maharashtra and Vidarbha) was merged with the princely states of Baroda, Western India and Gujarat (the present-day Indian state of Gujarat) and the Deccan States (which included parts of the present-day Indian states of Maharashtra and Karnataka). 

On 1 November 1956, Bombay State was re-organized under the States Reorganisation Act on linguistic lines, absorbing various territories including the Saurashtra and Kutch States, which ceased to exist. On 1 May 1960, Bombay State was dissolved and split on linguistic lines into the two states of Gujarat, with Gujarati speaking population and Maharashtra, with Marathi speaking population.

History

During the British Raj, portions of the western coast of India under direct British rule were part of the Bombay Presidency. In 1937, the Bombay Presidency became a province of British India.
After India gained independence in 1947 and when India was partitioned, Bombay Presidency became part of India, and Sind province became part of Pakistan. The territory retained by India was restructured into Bombay State. It included princely states such as Kolhapur in Deccan, and Baroda and the Dangs in Gujarat, which had been under the political influence of the former Bombay Presidency.

Expansion of the state
As a result of the States Reorganisation Act on 1 November 1956, the Kannada-speaking districts of Belgaum (except Chandgad taluka), Bijapur, Dharwar, and North Canara were transferred from Bombay State to Mysore State. 
but the State of Bombay was significantly enlarged, expanding eastward to incorporate the Marathi-speaking Marathwada region of Hyderabad State, the Marathi-speaking Vidarbha region of southern Madhya Pradesh, and Gujarati-speaking Saurashtra and Kutch states. The Bombay state was being referred to by the local inhabitants as "Maha Dwibhashi Rajya", meaning, "the great bilingual state".

In 1956, the States Reorganisation Committee, against the will of Jawaharlal Nehru, recommended a bilingual state for Maharashtra-Gujarat with Bombay as its capital, whereas in Lok Sabha discussions in 1955, the Congress party demanded that the city be constituted as an autonomous city-state. In the 1957 elections, the Samyukta Maharashtra movement opposed these proposals, and insisted that Bombay be declared the capital of Maharashtra.

Dissolution of Bombay state
Bombay State was finally dissolved with the formation of Maharashtra and Gujarat states on 1 May 1960.

Following protests of Samyukta Maharashtra Movement, in which 107 people were killed by police, Bombay State was reorganised on linguistic lines. Gujarati-speaking areas of Bombay State were partitioned into the state of Gujarat following Mahagujarat Movement. Maharashtra State with Bombay as its capital was formed with the merger of Marathi-speaking areas of Bombay State, eight districts from Central Provinces and Berar, five districts from Hyderabad State, and numerous princely states enclosed between them.

Chief ministers
Bombay State had three chief ministers after the independence of India:
Balasaheb Gangadhar Kher was the first chief minister of Bombay (1946–1952)
Morarji Desai (1952–1956)
Yashwantrao Chavan (1956–1960)

Governors

Upon the split of Bombay State in 1960, the designation of the "Governor of Bombay" was renamed to the Governor of Maharashtra.

Sources: Governor of Maharashtra and Greater Bombay District Gazetteer

Graphical

See also
 Political integration of India
 Samyukta Maharashtra movement for a separate Marathi state
 Mahagujarat Movement for separate Gujarati state.
 Indulal Yagnik

References

 
History of Gujarat (1947–present)
History of Maharashtra (1947–present)
1960 disestablishments in India
1950 establishments in India
Former states and territories of India